Windebank may refer to:

Sir Francis Windebank (1582–1646) was an English politician who was Secretary of State under Charles I of England
Sir Thomas Windebank, 1st Baronet (born c. 1612), M.P. for Wootton Bassett and supported the Royalist cause in the English Civil War. He was made a baronet in 1645. He was Clerk of the Signet from 1641 until 1645 and again from 1660 to 1674
Francis Windebank (Royalist soldier) (died 1645), supported the Royalist cause during the English Civil War. He was court-martial and shot for failing to defend Bletchingdon House, near Oxford.
Christopher Windebank (born 1615), an Englishman who lived in Madrid and worked as guide and interpreter for English ambassadors.
John Windebank (1618–1704), an English physician who was admitted an honorary fellow of the Royal College of Physicians in 1680 and was buried in Westminster Abbey.
Windebank (Hampshire cricketer) was an English professional cricketer.

See also
Windebank baronets, of Haines Hill (1645) extinct 1719